Monsieur Beaucaire is a 1946 comedy film starring Bob Hope as the title character, the barber of King Louis XV of France. It is loosely based on the novel of the same name by Booth Tarkington. It is a remake of the 1924 Rudolph Valentino silent film of the same name Monsieur Beaucaire.

Plot
King Louis XV of France is invited by his rival King Philip V of Spain to choose a suitable husband for Philip's daughter, Princess Maria, as a gesture of unity between their two nations. Louis's choice is the Duc le Chandre, but the duke fancies Madame Pompadour, as does the king.

Louis' barber, Beaucaire, becomes tangled in a web of deceit along with Mimi, a chambermaid he loves. Both end up exiled from France, and after Beaucaire assists the duke in hiding Madame Pompadour, all must ward off General Don Francisco, who is planning to overthrow Philip so that he can rule Spain.

After a series of mistakes and misadventures, Beaucaire shows his bravery in a sword fight with Don Francisco, and is rewarded by the duke coming to his rescue.

Cast
Bob Hope as Monsieur Beaucaire
Joan Caulfield as Mimi
Patric Knowles as Duc le Chandre
Marjorie Reynolds as Princess Maria of Spain
Cecil Kellaway as Count D'Armand
Joseph Schildkraut as Don Francisco
Reginald Owen as King Louis XV
Constance Collier as The Queen of France
Hillary Brooke as Madame Pompadour
Fortunio Bonanova as Don Carlos
Douglass Dumbrille as George Washington
Mary Nash as The Duenna
Leonid Kinskey as Rene
Howard Freeman as King Philip V
Lewis Russell as Chief Justice
Brandon Hurst as Marquis (uncredited)

References

External links
 
 
 
 

1946 films
American black-and-white films
Films based on American novels
Films directed by George Marshall
1946 comedy films
American comedy films
Films based on works by Booth Tarkington
Films scored by Robert Emmett Dolan
Films with screenplays by Frank Tashlin
Films set in the 18th century
Cultural depictions of Louis XV
Cultural depictions of Madame de Pompadour
Cultural depictions of George Washington
Paramount Pictures films
1940s American films